Johann Georg Sauer (born in Hanau, 6 January 1713 – died in Leiden, 18 December 1818) was a long-serving soldier in the army of the Dutch Republic, who lived in two centuries. 

Johann enlisted in the army of the Dutch Republic on 7 March 1734. He fought in the War of the Austrian Succession, taking part in the German campaign (1743), the Battle of Fontenoy (1745),  and the Siege of Bergen-op-Zoom (1747), the latter in which he was wounded several times. He remained with the army during the years the Republic remained neutral. His final engagement was the defense of Klundert in 1793. After a career of 65 years of service in the 8th National Infantry Regiment (then commanded by Lieutenant-general Bosc de la Calmette), Johann retired in 1795. After the restoration of the Orange Dynasty, he was taken into the Military Invalids House in Leiden (a military home for retired veterans), where he lived until his death in 1818, a month before he would turn 106 years old. His portrait was painted by  the year before; in it, he is depicted in the uniform he wore in his last years of service. Johann was buried on December 22 with full military honours, his funeral procession including the commander-director and medical officer of the Invalids House, followed by all able-bodied Invalids, as well as the town commander and the officers of the local garrison. His portrait is in the collection of the Teylers Museum in Haarlem.

See also
 Last European veterans by war
 William Hiseland: a British supercentenarian soldier
 Jean Thurel: a French soldier who lived in three centuries and served for 75 years

References

1713 births
1818 deaths
Dutch military personnel of the War of the Austrian Succession
Dutch centenarians
Men centenarians